Kwansŏ is the name of a region that coincides with the former Pyongan Province in what is now North Korea. The region includes the modern-day provinces of Chagang, South Pyongan and North Pyongan and the self-governing cities of Nampo and Pyongyang.

Geography of North Korea
Regions of Korea